Alexandr Shushemoin (born 26 February 1987) is a Kazakhstani former professional racing cyclist, who now works as a directeur sportif for UCI Continental team . He rode in the men's team time trial at the 2015 UCI Road World Championships.

Major results

2006
 1st Prologue Way to Pekin
2009
 7th Overall The Paths of King Nikola
2010
 2nd Gara Ciclistica Montappone
 3rd Overall Tour of Japan
 5th Overall The Paths of King Nikola
 5th Overall Tour de Kumano
 7th Overall Tour de Langkawi
 9th Road race, Asian Road Championships
2011
 2nd Road race, National Road Championships
2012
 8th Giro del Veneto
 10th Coppa della Pace
2013
 1st Mountains classification Tour of Bulgaria
 8th Mayor Cup
2014
 2nd Road race, National Road Championships
 4th Overall Tour of Szeklerland
1st Mountains classification
2015
 1st Stage 1 Tour of Iran (Azerbaijan)
 6th Overall Tour of Thailand
 9th Overall Grand Prix of Adygeya
 9th Memorial Oleg Dyachenko
 10th Overall Tour d'Azerbaïdjan
2016
 2nd Road race, National Road Championships
 2nd Overall Tour of Szeklerland
 5th Overall Tour de Korea
 10th Overall Tour of Thailand

References

External links

 

1987 births
Living people
Kazakhstani male cyclists
People from Petropavl
20th-century Kazakhstani people
21st-century Kazakhstani people